Seyfabad (also Romanized as Seyfābād and Saifābād) is a village in Jolgeh Rural District, in the Central District of Asadabad County, Hamadan Province, Iran. At the 2006 census, its population was 309, in 74 families.

References 

Populated places in Asadabad County